Fairbanks Depot is a freight and passenger railroad station in Fairbanks, Alaska. The station is the northern terminus for Alaska Railroad's Denali Star and Aurora Winter Train routes.

References

External links

Alaska Railroad stations
Fairbanks, Alaska